The South Australian Music Awards, also known as SA Music Awards, commonly SAM Awards, formerly Fowler's Live Music Awards (FLMA), are annual awards that exist to recognise, promote and celebrate excellence in the South Australian contemporary music industry. They take place in Adelaide, South Australia every November. The venue has varied over the years.

History
The inaugural South Australian Music Awards took place in November 2015, after having been known as the Fowler's Live Music Awards (FLMA) from 2012 to 2014, when custodianship was handed to Music SA. Fowler's Live (since 2018 and  Lion Arts Factory) was a popular Adelaide live music venue. Major partners are  the South Australian Government's Music Development Office (in the Department of Innovation & Skills), The Music, Moshtix & Australian Hotels Association.

Eligibility and awards

Eligibility
All applicants must have commercially released the entered work between the eligible period of 1 August to 31 July (of the award year). All applicants must have at least 50% of their band members residing in South Australia or they must identify and promote themselves as being South Australian. All applicants should be registered with APRA AMCOS. All entered works must be original compositions.

Award winners
People's choice awards are 100% voted for by the public via themusic.com.au. For the Industry and Major awards, a judging panel consisting of ten local and five national industry peers is selected each year. The panel includes a diverse range of gender, age and culture.

2012–2014: Fowler's Live Music Awards

2012 
The 2012 Fowler's Live Music Awards took place at Fowlers on 1 November 2012 to "recognise success and achievement over the past 12 months [and] celebrate the great diversity of original live music" in South Australia. 20 industry and five public voted awards were handed out. The winners are listed below.
 
Genre awards
 Best Acoustic Artist – The Audreys
 Best Country Artist - Tracey Pans & Claypan
 Best Electronica Artist - The Killgirls
 Best Folk Artist - Heather Frahn
 Best Hip Hop Artist – Hilltop Hoods
 Best Indie Artist – Fire! Santa Rosa, Fire!
 Best Jazz Artist - Bottleneck
 Best Metal Artist - Truth Corroded
 Best New World Artist – Shaolin Afronauts
 Best Pop Artist – Leader Cheetah
 Best Punk Artist – Coerce
 Best Rock Artist - Lady Strangelove
 Best Emerging Blues Artist - Carla Lippis & The Martial Hearts
 Best Emerging Contemporary Music Artist - Johnny McIntyre
 Best Music Initiative - Moving Music
 Best Music Manager - Daisy Brown
 Best Music Organisation or Individual - Alice Fraser
 Best Music Video – "You Should Consider Having Sex with a Bearded Man" by The Beards
 Achievement Awards - Sacha Sewell, El Dorado
 
People's Choice Awards
 Most Popular SA Release – Tales of Love & Loss by The Borderers
 Most Popular SA Band / Artist - The Borderers
 Most Popular Live Music Venue - The Governor Hindmarsh Hotel ("The Gov")
 Most Popular SA Live Music Event – WOMADelaide
 Most Popular Regional Band / Artist – Eviscerate

2013 
The 2013 Fowler's Live Music Awards took place in November 2013. The winners are listed below.
 
Genre awards
 Best Acoustic Artist - Kaurna Cronin
 Best Blues Artist - Don Morrison
 Best Country Artist - Amber Joy Poulton
 Best Electronica Artist - isima
 Best Folk Artist - Heather Frahn
 Best Hip Hop Artist – Jimblah
 Best Indie Artist – Bad//Dreems
 Best Jazz Artist - The Airbenders
 Best Metal Artist - Truth Corroded
 Best Pop Artist - The Beards
 Best Punk Artist – The Mark of Cain
 Best Rock Artist – Tracer
 Best Roots Artist - The Bearded Gypsy Band
 Best Music Initiative - A Band On Boat
 Best Music Manager - Ricky Kradolfer (City Riots)
 Best Music Organisation or Individual – Pilot Records
 Best Music Video – "Desert" by Messrs
 Achievement Awards - Tam & Anne Boakes
 
People's Choice Awards
 Favourite SA produced and Recorded Artist Release of the Year– One More Tear by Echo & The Empress
 Favourite SA band / Artist - Ice on Mercury
 Favourite SA Live Music Venue - Governor Hindmarsh Hotel ("The Gov")
 Favourite SA Live Music Event - WOMADelaide
 Favourite SA Music Media Source – Rip It Up magazine

2014 
The 2014 Fowler's Live Music Awards took place on 13 November 2014. Organiser Peter Darwin said "It is humbling to see the level of support both within the industry and from the music loving public for the FLMA's. The event has become a great celebration, and well-deserved recognition for our quality artists!" The winners are listed below.
 
Genre awards
 Best Acoustic Artist - Timberwolf
 Best Blues Artist - Lazy Eye
 Best Country Artist - Sandra Humphries
 Best Electronica Artist – Tkay Maidza
 Best Hip Hop Artist – Allday
 Best Indie Artist - Sparkspitter
 Best Jazz Artist – Ross McHenry
 Best Metal Artist - Truth Corroded
 Best Pop Artist - The Beards
 Best Punk Artist - Paper Arms
 Best Rock Artist - Bad//Dreems
 Best Roots Artist - Shaolin Afronauts
 SA Songwriters(s) of the Year - Bad//Dreems
 Best Music Initiative - The Porch Sessions
 Best Music Manager - Jason North & Greg Shaw
 Best Music Organisation or Individual – The Jam Room
 Best Music Video – "Grace" by Timberwolf
 Achievement Awards - Ross McHenry and Gordon Andersen
 
People's Choice Awards
 Favourite SA Song of the year – "Tempest" by Julia Henning
 Favourite SA band / artist - Julia Henning
 Favourite SA live music venue - Governor Hindmarsh Hotel ("The Gov")
 Favourite SA live music event - WOMADelaide
 Favourite SA music media source - Rip It Up magazine

2015–present: SAM Awards

2015
The 2015 South Australian Music Awards took place on 10 November 2015. The Ryan Freeman Live Music Award, created in honour of Ryan Freeman, a live music fan who died in 2009, was awarded to Kelly Menhennett who also received $4000 to assist her career. 2015 marks Music SA's inaugural custodianship of the rebranded awards. The winners are listed below.
 
Genre awards
 Best Release - Tkay Maidza
 Best Female - Tkay Maidza
 Best Male – Timberwolf
 Best Group – Grenadiers
 Best New Artist – Skies
 Best Song - Tkay Maidza
 Best Songwriter - Chris Panousakis (Timberwolf)
 Best Live Act - Bad//Dreems
 Best Music Video - "Switch Lanes"[ Tkay Maidza (directed by Sachio Cook)
 Best Cover Art - Skies (Cover art by Jack Vanzet)
 Best Producer – Motez
 Best Manager - 5/4 Entertainment
 Best Music Venue - The Governor Hindmarsh Hotel
 Best Festival / Music Event – WOMADelaide
 Most Popular Artist - Truth Corroded
 Ryan Freeman Live Music Award - Kelly Menhennett
 Fowler's Live Achievement Award - Robert Dunstan, Bside Magazine (for sustained contribution to the local music industry)

2016 
The 2016 South Australian Music Awards took place on 10 November 2016. The winners are listed below.
 
Genre awards
 Best Release - Bad//Dreems
 Best Female – MANE
 Best Male - Jesse Davidson
 Best Group - Bad//Dreems
 Best Aboriginal or Torres Strait Island Artist – A.B. Original
 Best New Artist - A.B Original
 Best Song - Tkay Maidza
 Best Music Video – "Kazoo" by God God Dammit Dammit (directed by Aaron Schuppan)
 Best Cover Art - Brokers (Cover art by James Packer)
 Best Manager - Craig Lock
 Best Music Venue - Grace Emily Hotel
 Best Festival / Music Event - WOMADelaide
 Best Engineer - Tom Barnes
 Best Studio - Mixmasters Studios
 Ryan Freeman Live Music Award - Kaurna Cronin
 Lifetime Achievement Award - Gary Burrows
 Best International Collaboration – "Do It Right " by Tkay Maidza (with Martin Solveig)
 
Public Voted Categories
 Most Popular Blues/Roots Artist - Ben Ford-Davies
 Most Popular Country Artist - Max Savage
 Most Popular Electronic Artist – Motez
 Most Popular Experimental / Avant-garde Artist – Sparkspitter
 Most Popular Folk / Acoustic Artist - Ben Ford-Davies
 Most Popular Heavy Artist - Stabbitha & The Knifey Wifeys
 Most Popular Hip Hop Artist – Koolta
 Most Popular Jazz Artist - Adam Page & Ben Todd

2017 
The 2017 South Australian Music Awards took place on 9 November 2017 at the Thebarton Theatre. The winners are listed below.

Genre awards
 Best Group - A.B. Original
 Best Male Artist – DyspOra
 Best Female Artist - Tkay Maidza
 Best Aboriginal or Torres Strait Islander Artist - A.B. Original
 Best New Artist - Heaps Good Friends
 Best Release – Reclaim Australia by A.B. Original
 Best Song – "January 26" by A.B. Original featuring Dan Sultan
 Best Music Video - "January 26" by A.B. Original featuring Dan Sultan (Directed by Richard Coburn)
 Best Cover Art - Stuart Highway by The Bitter Darlings  (cover art by Henry Stentiford)
 Best Manager - Craig Lock
 Best Music Venue - Grace Emily Hotel
 Best Festival / Music Event - Porch Sessions
 Best Engineer - Tom Barnes
 Best Studio - Chapel Lane Studios
 Ryan Freeman Live Music Award - Robert Dunstan
 Best International Collaboration - House of Songs Project
 Lifetime Achievement Award - The Governor Hindmarsh Hotel
 
Public Voted Categories
 Most Popular Blues/Roots Artist - Wanderers
 Most Popular Country Artist - The Bitter Darlings
 Most Popular Electronic Artist - Abbey Howlett
 Most Popular Experimental / Avant-garde Artist - Timberwolf
 Most Popular Folk Artist - The Winter Gyspy
 Most Popular Heavy Artist - Ice On Mercury
 Most Popular Hip Hop Artist - A.B. Original
 Most Popular Jazz Artist - Ross McHenry
 Most Popular Pop Artist – Rachael Leahcar
 Most Popular Punk Artist - Young Offenders
 Most Popular Rock Artist - Bad//Dreems
 Most Popular World Music Artist - Adam Page

2018 
The 2018 South Australian Music Awards was hosted by Zan Rowe and took place at  Thebarton Theatre on 8 November 2018. The winners are listed below.
 
Genre awards
 Best Group – West Thebarton
 Best Solo Artist – MANE
 Best New Artist – Adrian Eagle
 Best Aboriginal or Torres Strait Island Artist - A.B. Original
 Best Release - Different Beings Being Different by West Thebarton
 Best Song –"Bible Camp" by West Thebarton
 Best Music Video – "Better" by Mallrat (Directed by Rory Pippan – Young Black Youth)
 Best Cover Art - Neon Tetra (Cover art by Jack Fenby)
 Best Manager - Craig Lock
 Best Music Venue – Crown and Anchor Hotel
 Best Studio - Ghostnote Recording Studio
 Best Engineer - Mario Spate
 Best Music Festival / Event - A Day of Clarity
 Best International Collaboration – Zephyr Quartet
 Ryan Freeman Live Music Award - Max Savage
 Lifetime Achievement Award - Tam Boakes
 
Public Voted Categories
 Most Popular Blues/Roots Award - Ollie English
 Most Popular Country Award - The Heggarties
 Most Popular Electronic Award - Motez
 Most Popular Experimental Award - Abbey Howlett
 Most Popular Folk Award - Laura Hill
 Most Popular Heavy Award - Dirty Pagans and Hidden Intent
 Most Popular Hip Hop Award - Tkay Maidza
 Most Popular Jazz/Art Music Award - Adam Page
 Most Popular Pop Award - Heaps Good Friends
 Most Popular Punk Award - Young Offenders
 Most Popular Rock Award - West Thebarton
 Most Popular World Music Award - The Coconut Kids

2019 
The 2019 South Australian Music Awards took place in Bonython Hall at the University of Adelaide on 22 November 2019. Kelly Menhennett, Jimblah, Stellie, Jess Day, Horror My Friend and Electric Fields gave live performances.
 
There were a few changes in 2019. The APRA/AMCOS Emily Burrows Award, instituted in 2001 in memory of Emily Burrows, a former APRA AMCOS membership representative and compliance officer and awarded to a South Australian artist or band, was included in the ceremony. The "World Music" category was replaced with "Soul/Funk/RnB", and the "Best Engineer" category was split into "Best Live Engineer" and "Best Studio Engineer".
The winners are listed below.
 
 General Awards
 Best Group - Horror My Friend
 Best Solo Artist -  Adrian Eagle
 Best Aboriginal or Torres Strait Island Artist – Electric Fields
 Best New Artist - Jess Day
 Best Release - "A-OK" by Adrian Eagle
 Best Song – "Turned Loose" by Horror My Friend
 Best Music Video - "Wedding" by Horror My Friend (Directed by Ryan Sahb)
 Best Cover Art - "Caffeine" by Dress Code (Cover art by Jack Fenby)
 Best Manager - Alex Karatassa
 Best Music Festival / Event - Stonecutters / Porchland
 Best Music Venue – Lion Arts Factory
 Best Studio - Wundenberg's Recording and Rehearsal Studios
 Best Engineer - Mario Spate
 Best International Collaboration – Slava and Lenny Grigoryan with Beijing Duo as part of the Adelaide Guitar Festival  
 Lifetime Achievement Award – Neville Clark
 
People's Choice Awards
 Blues/Roots Award - Ollie English
 Country Award - The Cut Snakes
 Electronic Award - Electric Fields
 Experimental Award - Sons of Zöku 
 Folk Award - Ukulele Death Squad
 Heavy Award - Hidden Intent
 Hip Hop Award – Elsy Wameyo
 Jazz Music Award - Adam Page
 Pop Award – Germein
 Punk Award - Wing Defence
 Rock Award - TOWNS
 Soul/Funk/RnB Award - Wanderers

2020 
The 2020 South Australian Music Awards took place on 3 November 2020 at UniBar Adelaide. The inaugural presentation of a new award, the Innovation Award, was presented by CityMag magazine. The winners are listed below.
 
 General Awards
 Best Group - Wing Defence
 Best Solo  - Jess Day
 Best Aboriginal or Torres Strait Islander - Jessica Wishart
 Best New Artist - Siberian Tiger & Slowmango
 Best Release - "Soulitude" by Motez & Friends by Wing Defence
 Best Song - "Affection" by Jess Day
 Best Music Video - "Soulitude" by Motez  (Motez, Pilot Studio, Mapped Design, Daggers Production, Kelsey Pedler)
 Best Cover Art - "Shaping Distant Memories" by Lost Woods (cover art by Todd Fischer)
 Best Manager - Matthew Khabbaz
 Best Innovation - play / pause / play
 Best Music Educator - Nick O'Connor (Northern Sound System)
 Best Studio - Ghostnote
 Best Studio Engineer / Producer - Mario Spate
 Best Live Technician - Luke Hancock
 Best Small Festival/Event - The Porch Sessions
 Best Major Festival/Event –  St Jerome's Laneway Festival Adelaide
 Best Venue - Lion Arts Factory
 Best International Collaboration Award - "Maula Ya Ali" by Farhan Shah and Udan Khatola with Ustad Islamuddin Meer sahib.
 Community Achievement Award - Craig Armstrong
 Emily Burrows Award - Seabass
 
People's Choice Awards
 Blues & Roots - Ollie English
 Country - Jessica Wishart
 Electronic - Motez
 Experimental - Sons of Zöku
 Folk- Naomi Keyte
 Heavy - NO NO NO NO NO
 Hip  Hop - We Move Like Giants
 Jazz - Django Rowe
 Pop - Germein
 Punk - Wing Defence
 Rock - TOWNS 
 Soul/Funk/RnB  - Wanderers

2021 
The 2021 South Australian Music Awards took place on 18 November 2021 at the Old Adelaide Gaol.

 General Awards
 Best Group - Teenage Joans
 Best Solo - Motez
 Best Aboriginal or Torres Strait Islander - Tilly Tjala Thomas
 Best New Artist - Teenage Joans
 Best Release - Taste of Me by Teenage Joans
 Best Song - "Something About Being Sixteen" by Teenage Joans
 Best Music Video - "Poppy" by Glowing (Harry Nathan)
 Best Cover Art - "Taste of Me" by Teenage Joans (cover art by Samuel Graves & Eve Burner)
 Best Manager - Rachel Whitford
 Best Innovation - WOMADelaide x NSS Academy
 Best Music Educator - Alison Hams
 Best Studio - Chapel Lane Studios & Wundenberg's Recording Studio (tie)
 Best Studio Engineer / Producer - Kiah Gossner
 Best Live Technician - Lisa Lane Collins
 Best Small Festival/Event - Space Jams South Coast Tour
 Best Major Festival/Event – WOMADelaide
 Best Venue - Jive

 Special  Awards
 City of Adelaide Exceptional Live Performance Award - Teenage Joans
 Adelaide Unesco City of Music Best International Collaboration - Lazaro Numa
 Emily Burrows Award - Tilly Tjala Thomas
 Rosanna and Neville Clark Award - Ryan Martin John And Aidan Cibich
 Music SA Community Achievement Award - Mick Wordley

People's Choice Awards
 Blues & Roots - Cal Williams Jr
 Country - Ricky Albeck & The Belair Line Band
 Electronic - Motez
 Experimental - Sons of Zöku
 Folk - Siberian Tiger
 Heavy - Kitchen Witch
 Hip Hop - Boffa
 Jazz - Chelsea Lee
 Pop - G-Nat!on
 Punk - Teenage Joans
 Rock - TOWNS 
 Soul/Funk/RnB - Mum Thinks Blue

References

External links
 

Australian music awards
Awards established in 2012
Awards established in 2015
2012 establishments in Australia
2015 establishments in Australia
Annual events in Australia
Recurring events established in 2012